Furnissdale is a locality near Mandurah, Western Australia, to the south of Pinjarra Road and near the Serpentine River entrance into the Peel Inlet within the Shire of Murray. Its postcode is 6209. At the 2011 census, Furnissdale had a population of 1,027.

Furnissdale (along with Barragup) is served by a deviation of the Transperth 598 bus route along Pinjarra Road between the river and Ronlyn Road. However, the northern boundary of the suburb (Pinjarra Road) is serviced by routes 600 and 604 between Mandurah station and Pinjarra/South Yunderup respectively.

References

Towns in Western Australia
Suburbs of Mandurah
Shire of Murray